Thiès Department is one of the 45 departments of Senegal, one of the three located in the Thiès Region.

There are 4 urban communes in the department: Kayar, Khombole, Pout and Thiès.

The rural districts (communautés rurales) comprise:
 Arrondissement of Keur Moussa:
 Keur Moussa
 Diender
 Fandène
 Arrondissement of Notto:
 Notto
 Tassette
 Arrondissement of Thiénaba:
 Thiénaba
 Ngoudiane
 Ndiéyène Sirah
 Touba Toul
 Arrondissement of Thiès Nord
 Arrondissement de Thiès Sud

Historic sites  

Thiès town
 Railway station and warehouses
 Place Ibrahima Sarr, Ballabey city
 The building of the Director General of the SNCS
 "Building of the Three Clocks" of the SNCS
 Thiès Fort, now regional museum
 Principal building housing the Government
 Principal building housing the Chamber of Commerce
 Thiès Cathédrale and the Evéché building
 Building housing the Saint Anne's school opposite the Cathedral
 Thiès Post office

Thiès department
 Mbidièm Fort, Arrondissement de Pout
 Diack Quarries archeological site, Arrondissement de Thiénaba
 Diakité Quarries archeological site
 Pout Post Office

References

Departments of Senegal
Thiès Region